Tom Flood (born 17 May 1955) is an Australian novelist, editor, manuscript assessor, songwriter and musician.  Tom Flood was born in Sydney in New South Wales, and grew up in Western Australia. He is the son of Dorothy Hewett and Les Flood.   He is the brother of Joe Flood, Michael Flood, Kate Lilley and Rozanna Lilley.

Literature 
His first novel Oceana Fine won the 1988 Australian/Vogel Literary Award, the 1990 Miles Franklin Award and the 1990 Vance Palmer Prize for Fiction. He has had a handful of short stories published in newspapers and journals, both Australian and international.

Assessment 
In 2005 he started Flood Manuscripts, an assessment and editing service for writers. Many award-winning works have been associated with the service. In 2015 he became an editor and assessor with the international writing and publishing services aggregator, reedsy , concluded 2017.

His clients' awards include: The Banjo (HarperCollins) Prize 2020 (winner). Puncher&Wattman Prize, 1st Poetry Book 2019 (runner up). Westwords/Copyright Agency Western Sydney Emerging Writers Fellowship 2019 (shortlisted). Del Sol Press 2018 USA 1st Novel Competition (winner). Affirm Press/Tablo 'The Perfect Crime' competition 2018, a search for Australia's best undiscovered crime writer 2018(winner). The Book Club Pick 2016. Ned Kelly Best First Book 2016 (shortlisted). AIA Seal of Excellence 2015. Book Readers Appreciation Group Medallion 2015. IBPA Award ANZ Silver Medal 2014. ACT Book of the Year 2014 (shortlisted). William Saroyan International Prize for Literature 2012 (shortlisted). Nocte Awards: Best International Book 2011 (winner). Asher Literary Award 2011 (shortlisted). Manning Clark Cultural Award 2011 (shortlisted). CAL Scribe Fiction Prize 2011 (longlisted). Dundee International Book Prize 2009 (shortlisted). Maritime History Prize 2009 (shortlisted). Amazon Manuscript Award 2009 (longlisted) FAW National Award 2009 (commended). Ditmar Award 2007 (winner). Australian Shadows Award 2007 (winner). Golden Aurealis 2007 (winner). Best Horror Aurealis 2007 (winner). ABC Fiction Award 2006 (winner).

Music 
In 2010 Flood formed the acoustic blues and roots band BluesAngels. They released a limited edition EP on CD in 2013, 'Best Be Blue', an album on CD and digitally in 2014, 'Devil Don't Believe' and a music video 'Needle Never Caught'  in 2018. A pre-release 4-track EP, 'Rough Halos', was available in 2019.

Awards
Australian/Vogel Literary Award, Oceana Fine, 1988
Miles Franklin Award, Oceana Fine, 1990
Victorian Premier's Literary Award Vance Palmer Prize for Fiction, Oceana Fine, 1990

Works

Novels
 Oceana Fine (1989)

Drama
Model Citizen (1993)

Reviews
  Oceana Fine
 Westerly, Sept. 1990, p. 93-94
 West Australian, 22 October 1988, Weekend p. XI
 Sydney Morning Herald, 20 December 1990, p50

1955 births
Living people
Australian dramatists and playwrights
Australian male short story writers
Miles Franklin Award winners
Writers from Sydney
Writers from Western Australia
20th-century Australian novelists
20th-century Australian male writers
20th-century Australian short story writers
Australian male novelists